Urdu 1 is a Pakistani entertainment channel which broadcasts a variety of dramas. Initially channel used to air Pakistani, Indian and Turkish drama serials. However, after 2016 Uri attack channel stop airing Indian serials. Subsequently, it increased the original Pakistani content along with Turkish serials dubbed into Urdu. Baaghi and Tum Kon Piya are the serials which helped channel gain recognition among local audience. Later in 2017, channel was allowed to air Indian content again. Due to 2019 India–Pakistan border skirmishes, channel shut down the Indian programming. Since 2020, channel is solely broadcasting Turkish dubbed content.

Currently broadcast

Turkish 

 Dastak Meray Dil Pey 
 Mojza Doctor
Shajar e Mamnu

Upcoming Shows
 Zindagi 
 Teri meri love story

Formerly broadcast

Anthology
Dukh Sukh

Comedy
Cheetay
Dheeli Colony
Dulha Bhai
Kamal House

Dramas
Aatish-e-Ishq
Agar Ho Sakay Tou
Ahsas
Amanat
Andaaz-e-Sitam
Baaghi
Bay Aib
Be Inteha
Bilqees Urf Bitto
Dil Tere Naam
Gustakh Ishq
Jaan Hatheli Par
Jab We Wed
Jackson Heights
Jazeera
Kaisi Yeh Paheli
Khoobsurat
Kohar
Main Kaisay Kahun
Meher Aur Meherban
Mere Humdum Mere Dost
Mujhay Jeenay Do
Nazo
Paimanay
Pathjar Ke Baad
Sargoshi
Shehrnaz
Shehryar Shehzadi
Shert
Teri Raah Main Rul Gai
Titli
Tum Kon Piya

Reality and non-scripted
MasterChef Pakistan
Master Kitchen with Ammara
Star Iftar with Sarmad Khoosat

Soap opera
Bache Baraye Farokht
Beti Tou Main Bhi Houn
Bhabhi Sanbhal Chabi
Bus Yunhi
Chadar
Dil Apna Preet Parai
Ek Pal Ka Malaal
Hisar E Ishq
Malaika
Main Soteli
Meri Saheli Meri Humjoli
Murada Mai
Pul Kay Uss Par
Rivaaj
Tumhare Hamare

Telefilms
Ek Thi Marium

Turkish series
Zalim Istanbul
Aashiyana Meri Mohabbat Ka 
Budnaseeb
Ek Haseen Inteqaam 
Ek Haseena Ek Deewana
Emergency Pyaar 
Fatima Gul
Feriha
Haaji (Turkish Telefilm)
Hamari Kahani
Ishq 
Ishq E Memnu
Kaala Paisa Pyaar
Khali Hath
Karadayi
Kosem Sultan
Kuzey Guney
Main Ayesha Gul
Maral 
Nazli 
Nijaat

Spanish series

Isabel – Meri Akhri Mohabbat
Ek Dhund Si Chayi Hai

Croatian series

Lara Ki Kahani

Indian series

Saath Nibhaana Saathiya
Yeh Rishta Kya Kehlata Hai
Yeh Hai Mohabbatein
Nazar
Naamkarann
Kichri
Kasautii Zindagii Kay
Krishna Chali London
Diya Aur Baati Hum
Susral Simar Ka
Kullfi Kumarr Bajewala
Uraan
Ek Hasina Thi
Iss Pyaar Ko Kya Naam Doon?
Ishqbaaaz
Madhubala – Ek Ishq Ek Junoon
Ek Hazaaron Mein Meri Behna Hai
Veera
Pratigya
Tu Sooraj Main Saanjh, Piyaji
Meri Bhabhi
Tere Sheher Mein

References

Urdu 1
Urdu 1